Obukhov (masculine) or Obukhova (feminine) is the name of several rural localities in Russia.

Modern localities
Obukhov (rural locality), a khutor in Grushevskoye Rural Settlement of Aksaysky District in Rostov Oblast

Alternative names
Obukhova, alternative name of Obukhovo, a village in Gzhelskoye Rural Settlement of Ramensky District in Moscow Oblast; 
Obukhova, alternative name of Obukhovo, a village in Stepankovskoye Rural Settlement of Shakhovskoy District in Moscow Oblast; 
Obukhova, alternative name of Obukhovo, a village in Radovitskoye Rural Settlement of Shatursky District in Moscow Oblast; 
Obukhova, alternative name of Obukhovo, a village in Krivtsovskoye Rural Settlement of Solnechnogorsky District in Moscow Oblast; 
Obukhova, alternative name of Obukhovo, a selo in Obukhovsky Selsoviet of Pritobolny District in Kurgan Oblast;

See also
Obukhov No. 4, a rural locality (a khutor) in Bozhkovskoye Rural Settlement of Krasnosulinsky District in Rostov Oblast
Obukhov No. 7, a rural locality (a khutor) in Bozhkovskoye Rural Settlement of Krasnosulinsky District in Rostov Oblast